FC Nordstern 1896 München was a short-lived German association football club in Munich, Bavaria. Both Nordstern and 1. Münchner FC 1896 laid claim to being the oldest football clubs in the city. Alongside FC Bavaria 1899 München, these clubs were notable as founding members of the German Football Association (Deutscher Fußball Bund) at Leipzig in 1900.

Established by students in 1896, the club's only known recorded match was a lopsided 0:15 loss to newly formed Bayern Munich on 15 April 1900. Nordstern folded in February 1902.

References
 "Fußball in München. Von der Theresienwiese zur Allianz-Arena" 
 "München und der Fußball", Stadtarchiv München

Defunct football clubs in Germany
Defunct football clubs in Bavaria
Association football clubs established in 1896
Association football clubs disestablished in 1902
Football clubs in Munich
1896 establishments in Germany
1902 disestablishments in Germany